Lohana, also referred to as Loharana, Thakkar and Lohrana, are an Indian trading or mercantile jāti. Lohanas claim to be descendants of Lava, son of Rama, and to descend from the Raghuvanshi dynasty. The Lohanas are divided into many separate cultural groups as a result of centuries apart in different regions. Thus there are significant differences between the culture, language, professions and societies of Gujarati Lohanas, Sindhi Lohanas, and Kutchi Lohanas.

Origin 
According to historian Richard Burton, Lohanas originate in Lohanpur in Multan district of Punjab (now in Pakistan). Matthew A. Cook adds that according to Burton, Lohana's largely Punjabi origin can be considered on basis of "features and manners, ceremonies and religious opinions as well as their surnames." André Wink states that Lohanas were originally a sub-division of Jats.

According to Jürgen Schaflechner, there are many similarities between Punjabi Khatris and Lohanas, both of whom recruited Saraswat Brahmins as priests, have common religious rituals, mythologies, and even intermarried. Many Punjabi Khatris and Bhatias were also absorbed into the Lohana fold. Schaflechner cites the historian Rowe who states that "low ranking" Saraswat Brahmins originating in Balochistan formed a symbiotic relationship with castes such as Khatris, Lohanas, etc. who were trying to raise their varna status - which in turn would benefit the Saraswat Brahmins as well. For this purpose, certain religious texts were written during the British Raj era.

Sindhi Lohanas are considered a collection of Vaishya castes. Other than Brahmins and Bhatias, all Sindhis are grouped under the Lohana caste. Although classified as Vaishya in the ritual hierarchy and having been traditionally traders, they claim Kshatriya origin based on their belief that they are from the lineage of Ram. They claim that they are the descendents of Lava of the Ramayana. This claim was more common in the Lohanas of Sindh as per Schaflechner. A "mytho-historic" legend prevalent in the community is that the Hindu God Varuna built an iron fort for some Rathore Rajputs to protect them. Lohanas claim that the fort "disappeared" after 21 days and the Rathores were then called "Lohana", a word the community interprets as "those of iron". 

However, as per Pierre Lachaier their name derives from the city of Lohargadh in Lahore district of Punjab (now in Pakistan). Before their traditional occupation of traders, both the Lohanas and Bhatias were involved in the profession of Agriculture. Goswami states that their ritual position was "ambiguous", and, "they were considered neither a high nor a low caste".  The community could be traced back to 300 BC.

Sub-divisions 
Vast majority of Sindhi Hindus are Lohanas. Sindhi Lohanas have since been divided into several groups, among which are a traditionally more educated "upper section" called "Amils", who served as scribes to the Muslim rulers and a less educated "lower section" called "Bhaibands", who were traders: 
 Amils : The "upper section" of educated Lohanas who served the muslim dynasties as scribes in Sindh. In the 18th–19th century, they began working for the British. They currently are generally involved in clerical jobs in government offices, as working in posts of revenue collectors and other senior positions. They originally composed 10–15% of the Lohana community continued to draw members from those castes.
 Bhaibands : The less educated of "lower section", mainly involved in trade and commerce and so mostly merchants. Most were shopkeepers and money-lenders. The community was involved in international and trade in interior of Sindh even before the arrival of the British. They also played an important part in the development of the city of Karachi
 Sahitis: placed somewhere between Amils and Bhaibands, they could be either in government service or traders
For hundreds of years, the Sindhi Lohanas absorbed other communities from the western Indian subcontinent.

History
According to Chachnama, Samma was a branch of Lohana tribe. Ala al-Din Khiljl (1296-1316) mounted a number of campaigns in the region battling the Sumra princes whose cycle of capitulation/rebellion could be charted exactly to the perceived military stress on the metropole. Yet, the Delhi Sultans and their governor rarely resorted to invading Sumra held territories - relying, instead, on alliances with tribal elite and local power struggles. Against the Sumras, Khiljl advanced the cause of the Lohana tribe of Samma. The conflict guaranteed a rolling supply of princes and tribal chiefs wanting alliances with the center. The tussle for dominance between the Sumras and the Samma lasted until the reign of Firuz Shah Tughluq (1351- 1388), when the Jam emirs of Samma were finally able to end Sumra dominance, taking over lower Sindh.

Formation of Khoja and Memon Islamic communities
The community's oral history says that the decline of their kingdom began after the death of Veer Dada Jashraj. It also says that their name derives from the city of Lohargadh (/Lohanpur/Lohkot) in Lahore, from which they migrated in the 13th century after the establishment of Muslim rule there.

Pir Sadardin converted some Lohanas to the Shia Ismaili Nizari sect of Islam in the 15th century. As Lohanas were worshippers of Shakti, the emergence of a devotional Ismaili oral tradition that incorporated indigenous conceptions of religion, known as ginans, played a role in the forming of a new ethnic caste-like grouping. This group came to be known as Khojas (from Khawaja), a title given by Sadardin, that would predominantly merge into what is now understood as the Nizari Ismaili branch of Shia Islam.

In 1422, Jam Rai Dan was tribal leader in Sindh during the Samma Dynasty; he was converted to Islam by Sayad Eusuf-ud-Din and he adopted a new name Makrab Khan. At that time a person named Mankeji was head of 84 nukhs of Lohanas, who were in favour in court of that Samma king. He was persuaded by ruler and the Qadri to convert to Islam. However, not all Lohanas were ready to convert from Hinduism. But 700 Lohana families comprising some 6,178 persons converted in Thatta, Sindh.  These are now known as Memons (from Mumins).

Post-Partition 
After the Partition of British India in 1947, Lohanas from Kutch and Sindh migrated in large numbers to Gujarat, mostly to Kutch, Ahmedabad and Vadodara. Many also settled in Maharashtra in Mumbai, Mulund, Pune, and Nagpur.

Overseas diaspora

Thousands of Hindu Gujaratis left India between 1880 - 1920 and migrated to British colonies in the African Great Lakes region of Uganda, Kenya and Tanganyika. A significant number of these came from the Patidar and Lohana communities. At that time, however, there was already a bustling merchant class diaspora of Gujarati Muslims in these countries.

The Lohana migrants to East Africa, of which there were 40,000 in 1970, came mainly from the Saurashtran cities of Jamnagar and Rajkot. Many Lohanas set up businesses in those countries, two of the most successful being those set up by Nanji Kalidas Mehta and Muljibhai Madhvani.

In the later part of 20th century, following the independence of British colonies, and particularly after Idi Amin's expulsion order for South Asians in 1972, most Lohanas moved to the United Kingdom, and to a lesser extent to United States and Canada. In the UK, the highest concentration of Lohanas and other Gujarati Hindu communities is around the West London suburbs of Wembley and Harrow, and the city of Leicester in the East Midlands region of England.

Society and culture
Lohanas largely follow Hindu rituals and worship Hindu deities such as Krishna. They worship avatars of Vishnu such as Rama with his consort Sita and Krishna in the form of Shrinathji. They worship Shakti in the form of Ravirandal Mataji, and Ambika. The 19th century saints Jalaram Bapa, and Yogiji Maharaj, also attract many Lohana devotees. Their main clan deities  are Veer Dada Jashraj, Harkor Ba, Sindhvi Shree Sikotar Mata and Dariyalal. The Sun is also worshipped by the community. Some Lohana branches worship Hinglaj as a clan goddess.

Surnames

See also
Khasas
Bhanushali
List of Lohana Leaders

References

Bibliography

 
Sindhi tribes in India
Gujarati people
Hindu communities of Pakistan